Porteresia coarctata is a species of grass in the family Poaceae, native to India, Sri Lanka, Bangladesh, and Myanmar.

Porteresia coarctata is considered by some botanists to be the only species in the genus Porteresia. Other authors maintain instead that it should belong in the rice genus Oryza, as 
Oryza coarctata Roxb. It is a form of wild rice that grows in saline estuaries in Bangladesh and India and is harvested and eaten as a delicacy. The plant is salt-tolerant, and is seen as a possibly important source of salt-tolerance genes for transfer to other rice species. It is closely related to Oryza australiensis. The leaves of this species secrete salt through special microhair like structures that have three morphotypes, and a method to isolate these structures has been developed. Porteresia coarctata is a perennial species that shows substantial underground rhizomatous growth. The rhizome tissues give out aerial shoots in a favourable season.

References

External links 
 Grassbase - The World Online Grass Flora

Oryzoideae
Monotypic Poaceae genera
Flora of the Indian subcontinent
Edible plants
Cereals